The 2018–19 All-Ireland Senior Club Football Championship was the 49th annual gaelic football club championship since its establishment in the 1970–71 season. The winners receive the Andy Merrigan Cup.

The defending champions were Corofin from Galway who defeated Nemo Rangers from Cork on 17 March 2018 to win their 3rd title.

Competition format

County Championships

All thirty two counties in Ireland and London play their county senior championships between their top gaelic football clubs. Each county decides the format for their county championship. The format can be straight knockout, double-elimination, a league, groups, etc. or a combination.

Only single club teams are allowed to enter the All-Ireland Club championship. If a team which is an amalgamation of two or more clubs, a divisional team or a university team wins a county's championship, a single club team will represent that county in the provincial championship as determined by that county's championship rules. Normally it is the club team that exited the championship at the highest stage.

Provincial Championships

Connacht, Leinster, Munster and Ulster each organise a provincial championship for their participating county champions. The Kilkenny senior champions play in the Leinster Intermediate Club Football Championship. Beginning in 2018–19, London compete in the Connacht championship. In previous years they played one of the provincial champions in a single match in December referred to as a quarter-final.

All matches are knock-out. Two ten minute periods of extra time are played each way if it's a draw at the end of normal time in all matches including the final. If the score is still level after extra time the match is replayed.

All-Ireland

The two semi-finals between the four provincial champions are usually played on a Saturday in mid February. The All-Ireland final is traditionally played in Croke Park on St. Patrick's Day, the 17th of March.

All matches are knock-out. Two ten minute periods of extra time are played each way if it's a draw at the end of normal time in the semi-finals or final. If the score is still level after extra time the match is replayed.

TV Coverage
TG4 continue to broadcast live and deferred club championship games each year.  Eir Sport entered the second year of their agreement to broadcast live Gaelic football and hurling club championship games, including county championships, county finals and provincial and All-Ireland club championship matches.

County Finals

Connacht County & London Finals

Galway SFC

Leitrim SFC

London SFC

Mayo SFC

Roscommon SFC

Sligo SFC

Leinster County Finals

Carlow SFC

Dublin SFC

Kildare SFC

Kilkenny SFC

The Kilkenny SFC champions take part in the Leinster Club Intermediate Football Championship.

Laois SFC

Longford SFC

Louth SFC

Meath SFC

Offaly SFC

Westmeath SFC

Wexford SFC

Wicklow SFC

Munster County Finals

Clare SFC

Cork SFC

Kerry SFC

Limerick SFC

Tipperary SFC

Waterford SFC

Ulster County Finals

Antrim SFC

Armagh SFC

Cavan SFC

Derry SFC

Donegal SFC 

Down SFC

Fermanagh SFC

Monaghan SFC

Tyrone SFC

Provincial championships

Connacht Senior Club Football Championship

Connacht Quarter-Finals

Connacht Semi-Finals

Connacht Final

Leinster Senior Club Football Championship

Leinster Preliminary Round

Leinster Quarter-Finals

Leinster Semi-Finals

Leinster Final

Munster Senior Club Football Championship

Munster Quarter-Finals

Munster Semi-Finals

Munster Final

Ulster Senior Club Football Championship

Ulster Preliminary Round

Ulster Quarter-Finals

Ulster Semi-Finals

Ulster Final

All-Ireland

For official fixtures and results see All-Ireland Senior Club Football Championship at gaa.ie

All-Ireland Bracket

All-Ireland Semi-Finals

All-Ireland final

Two ten minute periods of extra time are played if the match is level at the end of the normal sixty minutes.

Championship statistics

Top scorers

Overall

In a single game

2018-19 Club All-Stars & Club Footballer of the Year

The Club All-Star awards were initiated in the 2017–18 season.

 Club Team Of The Year

 Bernard Power (Corofin)
 Liam Silke (Corofin)
 Patrick Fox (Mullinalaghta)
 Odhrán McFadden-Ferry (Gaoth Dobhair)
 Kieran Molloy (Corofin)
 Gavin White (Dr. Crokes)
 Donal McElligott (Mullinalaghta)
 Daithí Burke (Corofin)
 Odhrán MacNiallais (Gaoth Dobhair)
 Gary Sice (Corofin)
 Kieran O’Leary (Dr Crokes)
 Jason Leonard (Corofin)
 Tony Brosnan (Dr Crokes)
 Kevin Cassidy (Gaoth Dobhair)
 Martin Farragher (Corofin)

 Club Footballer Of The Year

Kieran Molloy (Corofin)

Also nominated -
 Kevin Cassidy (Gaoth Dobhair)
 Gary Sice (Corofin)

References

All-Ireland Senior Club Football Championship
All-Ireland Senior Club Football Championship
All-Ireland Senior Club Football Championship
All-Ireland Club SFC